Qol Qoleh or Qolqoleh, also rendered as Qulqulleh, may refer to:
Qol Qoleh, Dalahu, Kermanshah Province
Qolqoleh, Salas-e Babajani, Kermanshah Province
Qolqoleh, Dehgolan, Kurdistan Province
Qolqoleh, Marivan, Kurdistan Province
Qolqoleh, Sanandaj, Kurdistan Province
Qolqoleh, Saqqez, Kurdistan Province
Qolqoleh, West Azerbaijan